The Northern Illinois Huskies football statistical leaders are individual statistical leaders of the Northern Illinois Huskies football program in various categories, including passing, rushing, receiving, total offense, defensive stats, and kicking. Within those areas, the lists identify single-game, single-season, and career leaders. The Huskies represent Northern Illinois University in the NCAA's Mid-American Conference.

Although Northern Illinois began competing in intercollegiate football in 1899, the school's official record book does not generally include statistics from earlier than the 1950s, as records before this period are often incomplete and inconsistent.

These lists are dominated by more recent players for several reasons:
 Since the 1950s, seasons have increased from 10 games to 11 and then 12 games in length.
 The NCAA didn't allow freshmen to play varsity football until 1972 (with the exception of the World War II years), allowing players to have four-year careers.
 Bowl games only began counting toward single-season and career statistics in 2002. The Huskies have played in 12 bowl games since then, giving recent players an extra chance to accumulate statistics. Similarly, the Huskies have played in the MAC Championship Game seven times since 2005, meaning many recent seasons included 14 games.
 The Huskies' 11 highest seasons in total offensive yardage have come since 2000, with the seven highest seasons being 2010 through 2016.

These lists are updated through the end of the 2019 season.

Passing

Passing yards

Passing touchdowns

Rushing

Rushing yards

Rushing touchdowns

Receiving

Receptions

Receiving yards

Receiving touchdowns

Total offense
Total offense is the sum of passing and rushing statistics. It does not include receiving or returns.

Total offense yards

Total touchdowns

Defense

Interceptions

Tackles

Sacks

Kicking

Field goals made

Field goal percentage

References

Northern Illinois